92.1 OK FM (DZAI 92.1 MHz) is an FM station owned and operated by Satellite Broadcasting Inc.. Its studios and transmitter are located at Mcarthur Highway, Brgy. San Vicente, Urdaneta, Pangasinan.

References

Radio stations in Dagupan